The list of onroerend heritage sites in Dilsen-Stokkem with an overview of the protected heritage sites in the Flemish town Dilsen-Stokkem contains over 500 objects.

These lists are part of Belgium's national heritage:
 List of protected heritage sites in Dilsen-Stokkem (part 1) (numbers 71120–71544)
 List of protected heritage sites in Dilsen-Stokkem (part 2) (numbers 71546–71624, and others up to number 200339)

See also
 List of onroerend erfgoed in Limburg (Belgium)
Dilsen-Stokkem

References
 Flemish organization for Immovable Heritage, De Inventaris van het Bouwkundig Erfgoed, 2011

Dilsen-Stokkem